Société Belge des Transports par Air SA, known by its short form Sobelair, was a Belgian charter airline from that operated from 1946 to 2004. It was headquartered in Brussels (later in Zaventem) and operated mostly non-scheduled passenger and cargo flights out of Brussels Airport.

History

Sobelair was founded as a charter airline on 30 July 1946, originally (only during the initial months) known as Société d'Etude et de Transports Aériens, abbreviated SETA. The first revenue flight using a Douglas DC-3 aircraft, which took place on 15 October of that year, was a flowers transport to Nice via Paris. In 1947, scheduled flights from Brussels to Elisabethville in Belgian Congo were launched on behalf of several companies in the Belgian colony, which held the majority of the stakes in the company. In 1949, these shares were acquired by Belgian flag carrier Sabena, which thus owned 72.29 percent in Sobelair.

When Republic of the Congo (Léopoldville) was founded as an independent state in the former Belgian Congo, Sobelair ceased its African service, and concentrated on offering chartered holiday flights to the Mediterranean instead, as well as (between 1957 and 1962) domestic routes using small Cessna 310 airplanes.

Sobelair joined the jet age in 1971, when the first Caravelle was acquired second-hand from Sabena. Over the following years, the fleet was further modernized with Boeing 707 aircraft, which stayed until 1988. By then, Sobelair operated a fleet composed exclusively of smaller Boeing 737 airliners. Long haul flights were relaunched only in 1994, using a newly bought Boeing 767-300.

When Swissair started an alliance with Sabena in 1995, plans were made for a co-operation of the respective charter subsidiaries. Thus, Sobelair went into negotiation with the Swiss subsidiary of Trans European Airways in 1996, which turned out to be fruitless. Instead, an agreement was signed with Crossair. In 1997, Sobelair operated chartered passenger flights from Zurich to San Francisco and Las Vegas on behalf of Swissair. In the late 1990s, a charter contract with tour operator Jetair was signed. In 2001, further agreements with ALM Antillean Airlines and Balair were secured.

In October 2001, Swissair went bankrupt, which was followed by the demise of partner Sabena in November of the same year, which led to the future of Sobelair becoming uncertain, too. Delta Air Transport, which the Sabena slots had been transferred to, briefly considered taking over Sobelair's 767s for the re-launch of scheduled passenger flights to Africa (instead, Birdy Airlines was founded for that purpose), and German tour operator Preussag went into negotiations concerning a taking-over of the airline, which were dropped again in February 2002.

After having been acquired by a group of investors in June 2002, which led to the launch of scheduled flights on the Brussels-Johannesburg route, Sobelair was passed on to SN Brussels Airlines in early 2003, for which it operated charter flights henceforth. This did not lead to an improvement of the financial situation, and Sobelair declared bankruptcy in January 2004. TUI Travel placed an offer for taking over Sobelair's aircraft in order to create a Belgian airline subsidiary, provided that creditor protection would be granted. On 19 January, this measure was rejected, so that Sobelair went out of business and its then approximately 450 employees lost their jobs.

Fleet

Historical fleet

Over the nearly 60 years of its existence, Sobelair operated the following aircraft types:

Accidents and incidents
Sobelair suffered one fatal accident, which occurred on 22 April 1960. A Douglas C-54 Skymaster of the airline, registered OO-SBL, crashed into a mountain slope (a so-called controlled flight into terrain) whilst approaching an airfield in Bunia, then Belgian Congo. All 28 passengers and the seven crew members that had been on the chartered flight from Cairo died.
On 20 December 1970, a Sobelair Douglas DC-6 (registered OO-CTL) was damaged beyond repair when it ran off the runway at Málaga Airport. The cargo flight with seven occupants had had to perform an emergency landing at the airport in bad weather conditions because the left main landing gear could not be extended due to a hydraulic problem.
On 29 March 1981, an engine fire occurred with a Sobelair Boeing 707 (registered OO-SJA) shortly after take-off from Brussels Airport. The pilots returned to the airport and had to execute an emergency landing. As there had not been time to dump fuel, the airplane was too heavy, and was deliberately steered off the runway in order not to overshoot it, during which it suffered extensive damage. The 109 passengers and eight crew members survived the accident.

References

External links

 Official website (archived)
Sobelair aircraft

Defunct airlines of Belgium
Airlines established in 1946
Airlines disestablished in 2004
Zaventem
2004 disestablishments in Belgium
Belgian companies established in 1946